Waweig is a Canadian rural community in Charlotte County, New Brunswick.  Waweig is centered on the intersection of Route 760 and Route 127.

History

Notable people

See also
List of communities in New Brunswick

References

Communities in Charlotte County, New Brunswick